The 1999 Winter European Youth Olympic Winter Days was an international multi-sport event held between 6 and 12 March 1999, in Poprad-Tatry, Slovakia.

Sports

Medalists

Alpine skiing

Biathlon

Cross-country skiing

Figure skating

Ice hockey

Short track speed skating

Ski jumping

Medal table

References

External links
 Results

European Youth Olympic Winter Festival
European Youth Olympic Winter Festival
European Youth Olympic Winter Festival
European Youth Olympic Winter Festival
International sports competitions hosted by Slovakia
Youth sport in Slovakia
1999 in youth sport
March 1999 sports events in Europe
Sport in Poprad